Zantac can refer to either of two different H2 antagonists used to reduce gastric acid secretion:

 Ranitidine, prior to its 2020 withdrawal from the market
 Famotidine, following the withdrawal of ranitidine

GSK plc brands